Moreton railway station may refer to two railway stations in England:

Moreton railway station (Dorset)
Moreton railway station (Merseyside)

See also 
Moreton-in-Marsh railway station